Atlanta Municipal Airport  is a public airport located one mile (2 km) southeast of the central business district of Atlanta in Montmorency County, Michigan, United States. The airport is owned by Briley Township and Avery Township. It is located at coordinates  is accessible by road from Airport Road, located near M-32, and M-33. It is included in the Federal Aviation Administration (FAA) National Plan of Integrated Airport Systems for 2017–2021, in which it is categorized as a basic general aviation facility.

Facilities and aircraft 
It has two runways: 5/23 with an asphalt surface measuring 3,000 by 60 feet (914 by 18 m) and 13/31 with a turf surface measuring 3,223 by 100 feet (982 by 30 m). Runway 13/31 is closed from November through April each year and also when snow-covered. The airport is staffed upon request.

For the 12-month period ending December 31, 2021, the airport had 1,404 aircraft operations, an average of 27 per week, composed entirely of general aviation. There are 9 single-engine airplanes based at this airport.

The airport has an FBO that offers fuel to pilots.

References

External links 

Airports in Michigan
Buildings and structures in Montmorency County, Michigan
Transportation in Montmorency County, Michigan